XHNAQ-FM is a radio station in Querétaro, Querétaro. Broadcasting on 104.9 FM, XHNAQ is owned by Capital Media and is known as Lokura FM with an adult hits format.

History

XENA-AM 1450 came to air in 1949 as the second station of Radio Emisora Queretana, which owned XEJX 1250.

In 1962, XENA and XEJX moved to new facilities in Querétaro, inaugurated by Governor Manuel González Cossio, known as the Edificio Desarrollo Radiofónico (Radio Development Building). The building later came to serve as the company's namesake. XENA would be sold to Capital Media (Radiodifusoras Capital) in 2005.

XENA moved to FM in the early 2010s. Because the XHNA-FM and XHENA-FM callsigns were taken, XENA became XHNAQ-FM with the added Q for the state (Querétaro). This same change in callsign occurred with several other AM to FM migrants.

On January 1, 2019, XHNAQ flipped to grupera under the Capital Máxima brand. The format lasted just seven months; on August 1, the station flipped to romantic as La Romántica. On June 8, 2020, XHNAQ was one of seven stations to debut the new Lokura FM adult hits brand.

References

Radio stations in Querétaro